Sundarai Adare is a 2003 Sri Lankan Sinhala comedy action film directed by Upali Piyaratne and produced by S. Kanathapille for Orient Films. It stars Lal Weerasinghe, Dilhani Ekanayake in lead roles along with Robin Fernando, Cletus Mendis and Bandu Samarasinghe. Music composed by Neil Warnakulasuriya and co-worked with Sarath de Alwis. It is the 1000th Sri Lankan film in the Sinhala cinema.

Plot

Cast
 Lal Weerasinghe as Shane Weerasinghe
 Dilhani Ekanayake as Meena
 Robin Fernando as CID Inspector Gihan Disera
 Cletus Mendis as Senaka Weerasekera
 Bandu Samarasinghe as Shane's towel boy
 Thilak Kumara Rathnayake as Lionel Dissanayake
 Ruwanthi Mangala as Mangala
 Nadeeka Gunasekara as Madhura 'Madhu' Weearsinghe

Cameo appearances
 Nadeeka Gunasekara as Madhura 'Madhu' Weearsinghe
 Shashi Wijendra as Nuwan
 Ranjan Ramanayake as Murderer

Soundtrack

References

2003 films
2000s Sinhala-language films
Films set in Sri Lanka (1948–present)
2003 action comedy films
Sri Lankan comedy films
2003 comedy films